The lesser Chinese softshell turtle (Pelodiscus parviformis) is a species of turtle in the family Trionychidae. It is endemic to China, where it inhabits a small range in Guangxi and Hunan provinces. Populations of this species in Vietnam and Hainan are now considered to belong to a separate species, the spotted softshell turtle (P. variegatus). There is some controversy within researchers over whether or not P. parviformis is a valid species, but a study in 2015 reaffirmed it as such. 

It has been proposed that this species be considered as Critically Endangered on the IUCN Red List due to its restricted range and the heavy level of exploitation it receives.

References

Pelodiscus
Reptiles described in 1997
Reptiles of China
Turtles of Asia
Endemic fauna of China